Greene County Courthouse is a historic county courthouse located at Stanardsville, Greene County, Virginia.  It was built in 1838–1839, and is a two-story, gable roofed brick building. The front facade features a three-bay, pedimented tetrastyle portico addition using Tuscan order columns and a Roman Doric entablature added in 1927–1928.  The building is topped by a distinctive cupola.

It was listed on the National Register of Historic Places in 1970.

References

Courthouses on the National Register of Historic Places in Virginia
Government buildings completed in 1839
Buildings and structures in Greene County, Virginia
County courthouses in Virginia
National Register of Historic Places in Greene County, Virginia
Individually listed contributing properties to historic districts on the National Register in Virginia